Hartmanice is a town in Klatovy District in the Plzeň Region of the Czech Republic. It has about 900 inhabitants.

Administrative parts
Villages of Chlum, Dobrá Voda, Dolejší Krušec, Dolejší Těšov, Hořejší Krušec, Hořejší Těšov, Javoří, Keply, Kochánov, Kříženec, Kundratice, Loučová, Malý Radkov, Mochov, Palvinov, Prostřední Krušec, Světlá, Štěpanice, Trpěšice, Vatětice, Vlastějov and Zálužice are administrative parts of Hartmanice.

Twin towns – sister cities

Hartmanice is twinned with:
 Affoltern im Emmental, Switzerland
 Rinchnach, Germany

References

External links

Mountain synagogue Hartmanice

Cities and towns in the Czech Republic
Populated places in Klatovy District
Prácheňsko
Bohemian Forest